Pop Goes the Weasel (1999) is the fifth novel in the Alex Cross series written by James Patterson.

Plot
The book begins by introducing the villain, Geoffrey Shafer. He is a well-dressed and wealthy man who lives in Kalorama, Washington, D.C. and drives a Jaguar XJ12. In the beginning, he rushes into oncoming traffic causing a commotion, before a police officer pulls him over and asks him for some identification. This is when the reader finds out he is a British Diplomat who has diplomatic immunity.

As Geoffrey feels he is losing control, he decides to play a fantasy game called the Four Horsemen, in which he takes on the character of Death. As the game begins, he drives to the red light district, picks up a prostitute and e-mails the other Horsemen.

Characters
Alex Cross
John Sampson
Christine Johnson
Nana Mama

The Four Horsemen
 Geoffrey Shafer (The Weasel) – Death. The main villain in the book.
 Oliver Highsmith – Conqueror. The game was originally his idea. He was in charge of the other 3 when they were stationed in Bangkok.
 George Bayer – Famine.
 James Whitehead – War. War Recruited Shafer into MI6. Whitehead reported to Highsmith.

All four of them killed people in their area, but Shafer was more out of control. During their time in Bangkok they all murdered prostitutes.

Critical reception
Kirkus Reviews said Pop Goes the Weasel was a suspenseful novel that hinted towards a sequel.

References

1999 American novels
Alex Cross (novel series)
Novels set in Washington, D.C.
Little, Brown and Company books